The 2003–04 Macedonian Football Cup was the 12th season of Macedonia's football knockout competition. FK Cementarnica 55 were the defending champions, having won their first title. The 2003–04 champions were FK Sloga Jugomagnat who won their third title after appearing in their eighth Final in nine seasons.

Competition calendar

First round
Matches were played on 3 August 2003.

|colspan="3" style="background-color:#97DEFF" align=center|3 August 2003

|}

Second round
The first legs were played on 1 October and second were played on 22 October 2003.

|}

Quarter-finals
The first legs were played on 26 November and second were played on 3 December 2003.

|}

Semi-finals
The first legs were played on 10 March and the second on 15 April 2004.

Summary

|}

Matches

2–2 on aggregate. Napredok won on away goals.

2–2 on aggregate. Sloga Jugomagnat won on away goals.

Final

See also
2003–04 Macedonian First Football League
2003–04 Macedonian Second Football League

External links
 2003–04 Macedonian Football Cup at rsssf.org
 2003–04 Macedonian Football Cup at FFM.mk

Macedonia
Cup
Macedonian Football Cup seasons